Richard "Dick" Irvine (April 5, 1910 – March 30, 1976) was an American art director. He is best known for his Academy Award nomination in the category Best Art Direction for the 1941 black and white film Sundown. Over his long career, he worked as an art director in 31 films between 1939 and 1953.

In the early 1950s, Walt Disney asked Irvine to help construct Disneyland. He moved from 20th Century Fox to the Walt Disney Studio in 1952 and became a senior figure at Walt Disney Imagineering (WDI). Until his retirement in 1973, he headed design and planning for all Disneyland attractions including the Haunted Mansion and Pirates of the Caribbean. Irvine became executive vice president and chief operations officer at WDI in 1967.

Personal life
Irvine was born in Salt Lake City, Utah on April 5, 1910. Following his graduation in Stanford University and the University of Southern California, he attended the Chouinard Art Institute.

Irvine died on March 30, 1976 in Los Angeles, California after suffering an illness that prevented him from visiting the complete Walt Disney World Resort, which opened in 1971. In his honor, one of the original Walt Disney World riverboats was named after him (See Richard F. Irvine Riverboat). However, it was renamed the Liberty Belle in 1996, following which one of the Magic Kingdom ferries was named in his honor.

Selected filmography
 Sundown (1941)
 The Three Caballeros (1944)
 Miracle on 34th Street (1947)

References

External links

American art directors
Artists from Salt Lake City
1910 births
1976 deaths
Disney imagineers
Irvine, Richard F.